Highway 44 is an arterial road in central Israel.  It connects Tel Aviv-Yafo and Holon to Ramla, Lod and the Shefela. It is numbered as a north–south road and follows a north-west to south-east path.

Route description 
Highway 44 begins in the coastal plain at the south-eastern edge of Tel Aviv at Holon Interchange with the Ayalon Highway. It travels south-easterly, passing Mikve Yisrael, Holon's industrial zones, and Azor. It then crosses Highway 4 at HaShiv'a Interchange. This section is named HaShiv'a Road in memory of seven guards killed in 1948. Southeast of HaShiv'a Interchange the road crosses Beit Dagan Junction with Route 412, which connects it with Rishon Letzion and Yehud. The road then passes the Volkani Institute, the Tzrifin Military base, Assaf HaRofeh Medical Center and various industrial parks.

As Highway 44 enters the municipality of Ramla, it is briefly named Herzl Boulevard. Historically, the road continued straight through beautiful downtown Ramla. Since the mid-1990s, the road makes a left turn at Ramla North Junction onto HaHashmoa'im Street, bypassing Ramla along its northern edge. Just east of Ramla, the road passes Ramlod Interchange with Highway 40 and rejoins the original route, continuing past the Nesher Industrial Zone and the Nesher Cement Factory, one of the most impressive landmarks in the area.

Historically, just past Nesher, the road connected at Gezer Junction with Route 424 to the Gezer Regional Council. That junction was moved 1 km. further south to accommodate Nesharim Interchange with Highway 6 and Route 431. The road then continues past several agricultural communities until Nachshon Junction. Until this point, the road has travelled with almost no changes in elevation, averaging 75 meters above sea level. After Nachshon Junction, it begins a slow ascent into the foothills of the Judean Mountains passing several more agricultural communities and national forests. The road finally ends at Shimshon Junction with Highway 38.

History
For centuries prior, while Jaffa and its seaport served as the gateway into Palestine, the section of Highway 44 between Jaffa and Ramla formed part of the historic highway connecting Jaffa to Jerusalem and Bethlehem. The historic highway then followed modern highway 424 to Latrun, and continued to Jerusalem along the route of modern Highway 1.

After the establishment of the State, this road operated for many years as one of the main routes connecting the coastal plain with Jerusalem via Highway 38 and Sha'ar HaGai (Bab al-Wad). In 1948, the Latrun section of the old road to Jerusalem (Highway 1) was taken over by Jordan.  Traffic between Tel Aviv and Jerusalem was diverted to a new route called "Kvish HaGvura" (Road of Valor) of which Highway 44 served as the connection between Nachshon Junction and Shimshon Junction with Highway 38 leading to Sha'ar HaGai.

Future
The Israel Ministry of Transport has announced a grade separation of Highway 44 with the Lod-Na'an Railway line at HaHashmonain Street adjacent to Ramla North Junction.  The road will be raised to pass over the rail line. The estimated completion date is 2014 and the cost will be 160M Shekels.

Junctions and Interchanges

References

See also
 List of highways in Israel

Roads in Israel